is a Japanese drummer and actor. He is a member of Tokio, a Johnny Entertainment musical group. His nicknames are Mabo and Maa-kun. He starred as Shinichi Ozaki in Godzilla: Final Wars, and comedy series Yasuko to Kenji.

Career

As an artist 
Matsuoka joined the pop/rock band Tokio as a drummer in 1990, although the band did not debut until 1994. Along with other Tokio members, he was a background dancer for idol bands such as Hikaru Genji.

As an actor
Matsuoka has had parts in over 20 dramas. His first lead role was in Psychometrer Eiji, a 1997 mystery science fiction drama. In 2008 he starred a comedy series Yasuko to Kenji, based on a comical manga by artist Aruko.

Endorsements
Matsuoka has endorsed many various brands with the band Tokio and by himself. With Tokio, he has endorsed among others Microsoft's Xbox 360 and Eneos, a brand for Nippon Oil.

Filmography

Dubbing
Hercules (1997) as Hercules

References

External links
 Tokio Official Website
 
 

1977 births
Living people
Japanese rock drummers
Japanese male film actors
Japanese male child actors
Japanese male television actors
Tokio (band) members
Musicians from Sapporo
20th-century drummers
20th-century Japanese male actors
21st-century drummers
21st-century Japanese male actors